Goshen is a rural locality in the local government area of Break O'Day in the North-east region of Tasmania. The 2016 census determined a population of 93 for the state suburb of Goshen.

History
The name is a Biblical reference to fertile land. Goshen was gazetted as a locality in 1964.

Geography
The Scamander River forms the south-western boundary.

Road infrastructure
The Tasman Highway (A3) passes through from west to east. Route C841 (Terrys Hill Road) starts at an intersection with A3 on the western boundary and runs north before exiting to the north-west. Route C843 (Ansons Bay Road) passes through the north-east corner from south to north.

References

Localities of Break O'Day Council
Towns in Tasmania